Eurylemma auricollis is a species of beetle in the family Cerambycidae, the only species in the genus Eurylemma.

References

Lepturinae